Dayton is a town in Marengo County, Alabama, United States. The population was 28 at the 2020 census, down from 52 in 2010 and 60 in 2000.

History

Dayton began to be settled in the early 19th century, with a town survey done and a "public well" established in 1832. The post office was established in 1837. It was incorporated on January 13, 1844. A devastating tornado hit the town in 1852. By 1860 the town had male and female academies, a hotel, cotton gin, oil mill, blacksmith shop, tavern, cabinet shop, drug store, and several general merchandise stores. The town also had several large homes, though most are now gone. One of the survivors, the William Poole House, is listed on the National Register of Historic Places. The decrease in agricultural activity over the last century has reduced the population to a fraction of what it once was.

Geography
Dayton is located in northeastern Marengo County at  (32.349733, -87.641247).

The town sits on a ridge that drains southeast to Dry Creek and northwest to Little Dry Creek, both tributaries of Chickasaw Bogue, which flows west across the county to the Tombigbee River.

Demographics

As of the census of 2000, there were 60 people, 20 households, and 15 families residing in the town. There were 28 housing units. The racial makeup of the town was 65% Black or African American and 35% White.

There were 20 households, out of which 20% had children under the age of 18 living with them, 50% were married couples living together, 20% had a female householder with no husband present, and 25% were non-families. 25% of all households were made up of individuals, and 15% had someone living alone who was 65 years of age or older. The average household size was 3.00 and the average family size was 3.27.

In the town, the population was spread out, with 36.7% under the age of 18, 5.0% from 18 to 24, 13.3% from 25 to 44, 26.7% from 45 to 64, and 18.3% who were 65 years of age or older. The median age was 34 years. For every 100 females, there were 76.5 males. For every 100 females age 18 and over, there were 58.3 males.

The median income for a household in the town was $12,500, and the median income for a family was $6,250. Males had a median income of $32,917 versus $30,417 for females. The per capita income for the town was $10,235. There were 66.7% of families and 58.7% of the population living below the poverty line, including 50.0% of under eighteens and 50.0% of those over 64.

Climate
The climate in this area is characterized by hot, humid summers and generally mild to cool winters.  According to the Köppen Climate Classification system, Dayton has a humid subtropical climate, abbreviated "Cfa" on climate maps.

Notable people
 Sarah Byrd Askew, public librarian who pioneered the establishment of county libraries in the United States
 Bill Poole, politician

References

Towns in Marengo County, Alabama
Towns in Alabama
Populated places established in 1832
1832 establishments in Alabama